Antratsyt Raion or Antratsit Raion was a raion (district) in Luhansk Oblast in eastern Ukraine. The raion was abolished on 18 July 2020 as part of the administrative reform of Ukraine, which reduced the number of raions of Luhansk Oblast to eight. However, since 2014 the raion was not under control of Ukrainian government and has been part of the Luhansk People's Republic which continues using it as an administrative unit. The administrative center of the raion is the city of Antratsyt, which previously was incorporated as a city of oblast significance and did not belong to the raion, but in 2015 was merged into the raion.

Demographics 
As of the 2001 Ukrainian census:

Ethnicity
 Ukrainians: 62.8%
 Russians: 35.7%
 Belarusians: 0.4%

Settlements 
Settlements in the raion include:

 Zelenyi Hai

References

Former raions of Luhansk Oblast
1938 establishments in the Soviet Union
Ukrainian raions abolished during the 2020 administrative reform